Karl Ludwig Pfau (August 25, 1821 – April 12, 1894) was a German poet, journalist, and revolutionary.  He was born in Heilbronn and died, aged 72, in Stuttgart.

Poetry
Some of Ludwig Pfau's poetry has been used in the composition of Kunstlieder (or more popularly in English, Lieder).  Many German texts, including texts set to music by Schoenberg, have been collected and housed on-line at The LiederNet Archive.  Many are available in English translation in this collection.

References
 The LiederNet Archive: (Karl) Ludwig Pfau (1821-1894).  Retrieved 2017-03-06.

Disambiguation
A different Ludwig Pfau (1573–1630) of Winterthur, Switzerland was a maker of cocklestoves. Reference: Allingham, Margot (1999). Dutch Tiles: Introduction. Retrieved 2005-02-25.

1821 births
1894 deaths
German poets
German journalists
German male journalists
People from Heilbronn
People from the Kingdom of Württemberg
19th-century German journalists
German male poets
19th-century poets
19th-century German male writers